The steam tug Echo operated in the early 1900s on Puget Sound.

Construction
Echo was built at Tacoma in 1900 by Crawford and Reid for Captain O. G. Olson.  Echo was propeller-driven and 66.5' long.

Operation
On August 16, 1906, the Foss gasoline-powered launch Lion caught fire in Commencement Bay, when a fuel valve mistakenly left open had spilled 30 gallons of gasoline into her bilges, which was ignited by the engine backfiring.  Echo pumped water on board Lion until the fire was out, while a boat from the cutter Grant took off her crew and passengers.

Purchase by Foss Launch & Tug Co.
In 1916, Foss Launch and Tug Company bought Captain O.G. Olson's Tacoma towing business, including the steam tugs Echo, Elf, and Olympian.  In 1921, Perry Moore became Echo ‘s chief engineer. Foss continued to operate Echo until 1930, when she was laid-up at the company's yard in Seattle. In 1938, Echo was described as unfit for further service, her documentation was abandoned, and she was reported to have been burned for scrap near Shilshole Bay.

See also 
 Echo (sternwheeler 1865)
 Echo (sternwheeler 1901)

Notes

External links

Historic images from the on-line collections of the University of Washington
Elf in Tacoma Harbor (a similar steam tug, also owned by Capt. O.G. Olson and later Foss Launch & Tug)
Olympian, another steam tug owned by Capt. O.G. Olson

Steam tugs
Steam tugs of Washington (state)
Steamboats of Washington (state)
Propeller-driven steamboats of Washington (state)
Ships built by Crawford and Reid